Samir Naqqash (1938 in Baghdad – 6 July 2004, in Petah Tikva) was an Israeli novelist, short-story writer, and playwright who immigrated from Iraq at the age of 13.

Biography
Samir Naqqash was born in Baghdad, the first of six children born to a wealthy Jewish family. He began school at the age of 4, and started writing at 6. When he was 13, he and his family moved to Israel, and had to live under comparatively harsh conditions in an absorption center. Several years later, his father died, and this had a strong effect on him. Determined to leave Israel to find himself, Naqqash lived in Turkey, Iran, Lebanon, Egypt, India, and the United Kingdom from 1958 to 1962, but faced difficulties and was forced to return to Israel, where he took various jobs.

In the 1970s, he studied at the Hebrew University of Jerusalem, and received his degree in Arabic literature.  He was well known in the Arab world and among the Iraqi community in Israel, but only one of his works was translated into Hebrew.  Naqqash won the Israeli Prime Ministerial Award for Arabic literature.

Naqqash often called himself an Arab who believed in Judaism. In the documentary "Forget Baghdad" (2002), he said that he had not wanted to go to Israel but was taken there in handcuffs by the Jewish Agency for Israel.  He never felt at home in Israel, and considered himself an Iraqi in exile. He continued to publish and write in Arabic. He saw himself as part of the great tradition of Arabic folklore and literature. He was often criticized for his Arabic sounding first name but he refused to change it. After his death, Iraqi expatriates declared their wish to have him buried in Iraq, reasoning that he has shown more dedication to Iraq than any other expatriate.

Naqqash was married, and had one daughter and two sons.

References

External links
 With new translation, Samir Naqqash’s place in Israeli literature should finally be celebrated, Mondoweiss, Mati Shemoelof, 18.8.2020
 In English :http://acc.teachmideast.org/texts.php?module_id=7&reading_id=310&sequence=1 
  Art, etc. / Exiled from Babylon, Obituary in Haaretz by Neri Livneh, 6 August 2004
 Marking the Passing of Samir Naqqash, by David Shasha, Kedma, 22 July 2004 (in Hebrew)
 

1938 births
2004 deaths
Israeli Arab Jews
Hebrew University of Jerusalem alumni
Iraqi emigrants to Israel
Israeli people of Iraqi-Jewish descent
Iraqi Jews
Israeli male dramatists and playwrights
Israeli novelists
Israeli male short story writers
Israeli short story writers
Jewish dramatists and playwrights
Jewish novelists
Israeli Mizrahi Jews
Naturalized citizens of Israel
Writers from Baghdad
20th-century novelists
20th-century Israeli dramatists and playwrights
20th-century short story writers
20th-century French male writers
Burials at Segula Cemetery